Aude was the pen name of Claudette Charbonneau-Tissot (June 22, 1947 – October 25, 2012), a Canadian writer from Quebec. She is most noted for her 1997 short story collection Cet imperceptible mouvement, which won the Governor General's Award for French-language fiction at the 1997 Governor General's Awards, and her 1998 novel L'Enfant migrateur.

Biography
Born in Montreal, Charbonneau-Tissot studied French literature at the Université de Montréal and creative writing at Université Laval. A teacher at Cégep Garneau in the 1970s, she wrote frequently for the literary journal La Barre du jour and the lifestyle magazine Châtelaine.

Over the course of her career, she published novels, short stories and a work of children's literature. In addition to her Governor General's Award win for Cet imperceptible mouvement, Jill Cairns won the John Glassco Translation Prize in 1999 for its English translation, The Indiscernible Movement.

She was diagnosed with leukemia in 2005, and her writing slowed down considerably after the publication of her 2006 novel Chrysalide. Her final volume of short stories, Éclats de lieux, was published in 2012 just a few weeks before her death. She died on October 25, 2012 in Quebec City.

Works
 Contes pour hydrocéphales adultes (1974, short stories)
 La Contrainte (1976, short stories)
 Les Petites Boîtes (1983, children's literature)
 L'Assembleur (1985, novel)
 Banc de brume, ou Les Aventures de la petite fille que l'on croyait partie avec l'eau du bain (1987, short stories)
 La Chaise au fond de l'œil (1997, novel)
 Cet imperceptible mouvement (1997, short stories)
 L'Enfant migrateur (1998, novel)
 L'Homme au complet (1999, novel)
 Quelqu'un (2002, novel)
 Chrysalide (2006, novel)
 Éclats de lieux (2012, short stories)

References

1947 births
2012 deaths
Canadian women novelists
Canadian children's writers in French
20th-century Canadian novelists
21st-century Canadian novelists
Writers from Montreal
French Quebecers
Deaths from leukemia
Canadian women children's writers
20th-century Canadian women writers
21st-century Canadian women writers
Canadian novelists in French
Canadian women short story writers
20th-century Canadian short story writers
21st-century Canadian short story writers
Université Laval alumni
Deaths from cancer in Quebec
Governor General's Award-winning fiction writers